Ginny Georgantas (born 28 November 1979) is a Greek softball player. She competed in the women's tournament at the 2004 Summer Olympics.

References

1979 births
Living people
Greek softball players
Olympic softball players of Greece
Softball players at the 2004 Summer Olympics
Sportspeople from Joliet, Illinois
Softball players from Illinois